Juan de las Cabezas Altamirano (1565 – 19 December 1615) was a Roman Catholic prelate who served as Bishop of Arequipa (1615), Bishop of Santiago de Guatemala (1610–1615), and Bishop of Santiago de Cuba (1602–1610).

Biography
Juan de las Cabezas Altamirano was born in Zamora, Spain in 1565.
On 15 April 1602, he was appointed during the papacy of Pope Clement VIII as Bishop of Santiago de Cuba. 
On 19 July 1610, he was appointed during the papacy of Pope Paul V as Bishop of Santiago de Guatemala.
On 16 September 1615, he was appointed during the papacy of Pope Paul V as Bishop of Arequipa.
He served as Bishop of Arequipa until his death on 19 December 1615. 
While bishop, he was the principal consecrator of Alfonso del Galdo, Bishop of Comayagua (1613).

References

External links and additional sources
 (for Chronology of Bishops)  
 (for Chronology of Bishops) 
 (for Chronology of Bishops) 
 (for Chronology of Bishops) 
 (for Chronology of Bishops) 
 (for Chronology of Bishops) 

17th-century Roman Catholic bishops in Cuba
Bishops appointed by Pope Clement VIII
Bishops appointed by Pope Paul V
1565 births
1615 deaths
Roman Catholic bishops of Guatemala (pre-1743)
Roman Catholic bishops of Santiago de Cuba
Roman Catholic bishops of Arequipa